Indira Gandhi Athletic Stadium, also known as Sarusajai Stadium, is a football stadium in Guwahati, Assam, India. It is the current home ground of NorthEast United FC. Besides hosting football matches, the stadium is also used for athletics. It had a total capacity of 35,000 which was later reduced to 25,000 due to installation of bucket seats for 2017 FIFA U-17 World Cup, which was hosted in India. In 2007, it hosted the 33rd National Games of India and in 2016, hosted the 12th South Asian Games. The stadium hosted the Assam Global Investors' Summit on 3 and 4 February 2018 and the 65th Filmfare Awards on 15 February 2020.

The stadium recorded the highest attendance for a football game in Assam when 32,844 spectators came to see the ISL match between local club NorthEast United and visitors Chennaiyin on 20 October 2016.

History

This one-tier multipurpose stadium is located in Lokhra, Guwahati, Assam, Northeast India. There is only a limited number of seats in the main stand however bucket seats are now installed for rest of the stands to conduct the FIFA U17 World Cup, 2017.

The stadium pays tribute to the late Indira Gandhi who was the third Prime Minister of India. An international friendly between India and Malaysia was played at this stadium on 13 November 2011. On 12 March 2015 India played against Nepal for the 2018 World Cup qualifier.

From 2014, it has been the home ground for NorthEast United FC in the newly formed Indian Super League and for which it underwent major renovations. The stadium has been selected as one of the provisional venues for the FIFA U-17 World Cup to be held in India in 2017. Further upgrade plans are expected to be put in place like introduction of bucket seats, refurbished media and broadcast box etc.

The stadium was the main venue of 2016 South Asian Games, which was held in both Guwahati and Shillong from 5 to 16 February 2016.

The stadium was also used by I-League champions Aizawl FC (2016–17) of Mizoram and Minerva Punjab FC (2017–18) of Punjab as their home ground for AFC group stage matches.

The stadium has been selected as one of the provisional venues for the FIFA U-17 Women's World Cup to be held in India in 2020 where it will host the opening.

On March, 2020, the Government of Assam constructed isolation wards during the COVID-19 pandemic in India in the premises.

Major Football Matches
As well as local matches, the stadium has also hosted major national and international matches.

India national football team matches

2017 FIFA U-17 World Cup matches.

References

External links
Stadium information 
Stadium history
Groundhopping page

Football venues in Assam
Athletics (track and field) venues in India
Sports venues in Guwahati
Monuments and memorials to Indira Gandhi
Indian Super League stadiums
2017 FIFA U-17 World Cup venues
2007 establishments in Assam
Sports venues completed in 2007